Kirk Terry Dornbush (born 1933) is a former United States Ambassador to the Netherlands. He served from 1994 until 1998.

Biography
Dornbush was born in Atlanta, Georgia in 1933. He earned his B.A. degree from Vanderbilt University.

References

Living people
1933 births
Ambassadors of the United States to the Netherlands
People from Atlanta
Vanderbilt University alumni